Paolo Di Cioccio (born 1963 in Rome) is an oboist and composer. He is a professor at the Conservatorium "F. Torrefranca" and the "International Polytechnic Scientia et Ars" in Vibo Valentia, Italy. He was the first oboist who recorded "Oboe Sconcerto" with the music of Albinoni, Vivaldi and Marcello for the oboe together with analog synthesizers (Modular Moog, Arp 2600). He plays a Marigaux oboe.

Discography
Images (1999)
Logos (2002)
Oboe Sconcerto (2005 - Domani Musica)
Vissi d'oboe (2006 - Domani Musica)
Tour de France (2007 - Domani Musica)
The Planets (2007)

References

Italian classical oboists
Male oboists
Italian composers
Italian male composers
1963 births
Living people